Zaidi may refer to:

 The Zaidiyyah sect of Islam or Al-Zaidi, its adherents
 Al-Zaidi, Arab descendants of Zayd ibn Ali
 Zaidi Wasitis, people with the surname Zaidi, South Asian descendants of Zayd ibn Ali, from Wasit, Iraq, followers of Twelver or Athnā‘ashariyyah (Ja'fari jurisprudence)
 Zaidi Al Wasti, another surname found among the same people 
 Yiddish informal title for grandfather

See also 
 Zaidee, given name
 Wasti